The Wheego Whip was an early-2010s limited-production all-electric city car developed by Wheego Technologies, made from the bodyshell of the Shuanghuan Noble. A total of approximately 300 units were sold through 2013, when production ceased.

History
Wheego Electric Cars  Inc. was formed as a spin out from RTEV (Ruff & Tuff Electric Vehicles) in June 2009 and its first automobile was a two-seat compact car under the Wheego Whip name in North America and marketed by Shuanghuan Auto in China as the E-Noble, its brand name for the rest of the world.

Production and sales
, the company had manufactured 36 cars since April 2011, and only two cars were left in inventory. Wheego's business strategy was to build the cars only when the company gets money from sales or through venture capital. About 400 units were sold through 2013, when production ended.

See also
 List of modern production plug-in electric vehicles
 List of production battery electric vehicles
 Government incentives for plug-in electric vehicles
 Zero-emissions vehicle

References

External links

Wheego Technologies website

Electric city cars
Production electric cars
2011 introductions